Crăciunelu may refer to one of two places in Alba County, Romania:

 Crăciunelu de Jos, a commune
 Crăciunelu de Sus, a village in Cetatea de Baltă Commune